Mok Champae is a village and tambon (sub-district) of Mueang Mae Hong Son District, in Mae Hong Son Province, Thailand. In 2010 it had a population of 6,936 people (compared to 7,271 people in 2005).

Administration
Since 1997 the sub-district has had a tambon administrative organization (TAO). The sub-district is divided into nine administrative villages.

References

External links
ThaiTambon.com

Tambon of Mae Hong Son province
Populated places in Mae Hong Son province